Tarandowah Golfers Club is a golf course located in Springfield, Ontario, Canada.

Opened in 2007 and designed by Martin Hawtree, Tarandowah has been under new ownership since 2020 when it was purchased out of bankruptcy by PI Homes' Rashad Ayyash. In 2021 it was featured as the 40th best public golf course in Ontario by SCOREGolf.

References

External links
 

 http://www.golfadvisor.com/courses/27143-tarandowah-golfers-club/
 http://www.golfpassport.com/course_detail.aspx?i=240

Golf clubs and courses in Ontario
Buildings and structures in Elgin County